Marie-Claire Cordonier Segger is a full professor, senior executive, an international expert in policy, law and governance on climate change, biodiversity, human rights, trade, investment and financial law and the world's Sustainable Development Goals. She currently serves as Leverhulme Trust Visiting Professor at the University of Cambridge, UK; executive secretary of the global Climate Law and Governance Initiative (CLGI) and senior director of the Centre for International Sustainable Development Law (CISDL). She is also a Fellow in Law & LLM/MCL Director of Studies at the Lucy Cavendish College; fellow at the Lauterpacht Centre for International Law; visiting fellow at the Bennett Institute for Public Policy  and Fellow at the Cambridge Centre for Energy, Environment & Natural Resource Governance. Further, she is full professor at the University of Waterloo School of Environment, Enterprise and Development in Waterloo, Ontario, Canada, where she is also senior fellow at the Balsillie School of International Affairs (BSIA) and senior advisor to the Interdisciplinary Centre on Climate Change (IC3). She serves as chair of the Convention on Biological Diversity (CBD) Biodiversity Law & Governance Initiative; rapporteur for the International Law Association Committee on Sustainable Natural Resources Management; co-founder member of the board of the Sustainable Development Solutions Network (SDSN) of Canada; member of the International Law Association (ILA) Board of Canada; co-founder and councillor of the World Future Council.

Education

Cordonier Segger completed her undergraduate studies BA(Hons) in the Institute for Interdisciplinary Studies at Carleton University and the University of Victoria, followed by a Bachelor of Civil Law/Bachelor of Laws at McGill University, where she did an exchange year at the London School of Economics. She went on to complete a Master of Environmental Management at Yale University, and a DPhil in international law from the University of Oxford; Exeter College.

Professional career

Cordonier Segger began her professional career working as a manager and senior advisor for the United Nations Environment Programme from 1998 to 2004. During that timeframe, she was also an advisor for the North American Commission for Environmental Cooperation (2000–2002), associate fellow at Chatham House/Royal Institute of International Affairs (2000–2004), teaching fellow at Yale University (2002–2003) and co-founded and became director of the Centre for International Sustainable Development Law (2002-current). In addition, she became a member of both the Canadian Bar Association (2002-current) and International Law Association (2002-current). From 2004 to 2006, Cordonier Segger worked as a course development expert and instructor at the National Judicial Institute of Canada and as seminar and lecture series coordinator for the Faculty of Law at Oxford University.

Between 2006 and 2010, Cordonier Segger worked as assistant director in sustainable development and international affairs at Natural Resources Canada, began as international professor in the Faculty of Law at the University of Chile (2009–2015), and was the senior director of research and sustainable prosperity at the University of Ottawa (2008–2010). From 2010 to 2015, she was senior legal expert and sustainable development head at the International Development Law Organization, senior legal advisor for the Ramsar Convention on Wetlands of International Importance (2013–2015) and international professor in the Faculty of Natural Resources and Faculty of Law at the University of Kisangani (2012–2017).

In 2015 Cordonier Segger acted as senior legal advisor to the presidency of the twenty-second meeting of the Conference of the Parties to the UNFCCC (2015–2017) and became executive secretary of the Climate Law & Governance Initiative (2015–2021). From 2016 to 2019, she worked as senior policy advisor and manager in governance and stakeholder relations at Environment and Climate Change Canada. In 2016, the Office of the Commissioner for Fundamental Rights in the Government of Hungary awarded her the Justitia Regnorum Fundamentum Award. The same year, she became full professor at the School of Environment, Enterprise & Development (SEED), University of Waterloo, Canada (2016-current).

As of 2019, she serves as Leverhulme Trust Visiting Professor at the University of Cambridge and as a Fellow in Law & LLM/MCL Director of Studies at the Lucy Cavendish College. Most recently in 2020, Cordonier Segger was named an inaugural laureate of the Weeramantry International Justice Award.

Awards
 Weeramantry International Justice Award (2020)
Leverhulme Trust Visiting Professorship Award (2019)
Justitia Fundamentum Regnorum (2016)
United Nations National Technical Assistance Commendations from 26 countries, 2002-2020

Publications

Cordonier Segger has edited or authored over 22 books and authored over 120 papers. Representative publications include:

 Athena’s Treaties: Crafting Trade and Investment Accords for Sustainable Development (Oxford University Press, published 2021).
 Implementing International Law through Domestic Institutions for Inter-Generational Justice (Cambridge University Press, published 2020), with Marcel Szabo and Alexandra Harrington. 
 Sustainable Development in International Courts and Tribunals (Routledge, published 2017), ed. with HE Judge Christopher Weeramantry. 
 Sustainable Development, International Criminal Justice, and Treaty Implementation (Cambridge University Press, 2013) with Sébastien Jodoin. 
 Legal Aspects of Implementing the Cartagena Protocol on Biosafety (Cambridge University Press, 2013), ed, with F. Perron-Welch, and C. Frison.
 Sustainable Development in World Investment Law (Kluwer Law International, 2010), editor with Markus Gehring and Andrew Newcombe.
 World Trade Law in Practice (Globe Business Publishers, 2006). 
 Beyond the Barricades: The Americas Trade and Sustainable Development Agenda (Ashgate Publishing, 2005) contributor with Maria Leichner Reynal. 
 Sustainable Development Law: Principles, Practices and Prospects (Oxford University Press, 2004), with Ashfaq Khalfan. 
 Sustainable Justice: Integrating Environmental, Social and Economic Law (Martinus Nijhoff, 2004), editor with HE Judge Christopher Weeramantry.
 Weaving the Rules for Our Common Future(CISDL, 2002), with Ashfaq Khalfan and S. Nakhjavan.
 Trade Rules and Sustainability in the Americas (International Institute for Sustainable Development, 1999).  
 War No More: Poetry in Hope of Peace (Morris, 1992), with D Mittler.

References

Canadian lawyers
Alumni of the University of Oxford
Academics of the University of Cambridge
Living people
Canadian educators
Year of birth missing (living people)
McGill University Faculty of Law alumni